Stutzman is a surname of German origin. Notable people with the name include:
 Alexander Stutzman (1820–1900), American politician from Pennsylvania
 Barronelle Stutzman (born 1945), American florist
 Christy Stutzman, American businesswoman and politician from Indiana
 Marlin Stutzman (born 1976), American politician from Indiana
 Matt Stutzman (born 1982),  American athlete who competes in archery
 Preston Stutzman, film producer and actor

See also
 Stutsman (disambiguation)